John Bourke, 2nd Earl of Mayo (circa 1729 – 20 April 1792), styled Lord Naas until 1790, was an Irish politician and peer who was MP for Naas (1763–90).

Career

Bourke was the son of John Bourke, 1st Earl of Mayo and Mary Deane, daughter of Joseph Deane. He was educated at Trinity College, Dublin.

He sat in the Irish House of Commons as the Member of Parliament for Naas between 1763 and 1790. That year he inherited his father's titles and assumed his seat in the Irish House of Lords.

Family
He married Lady Mary Leeson, daughter of Joseph Leeson, 1st Earl of Milltown and Cecilia Leigh, in February 1764. He died without issue.

Arms

References

Year of birth unknown
1790 deaths
John
Irish MPs 1761–1768
Irish MPs 1769–1776
Irish MPs 1776–1783
Irish MPs 1783–1790
Members of the Parliament of Ireland (pre-1801) for County Kildare constituencies
Year of birth uncertain
Earls of Mayo
Alumni of Trinity College Dublin